Yoshimura is a Japanese surname. Notable people with the surname include:

, Japanese novelist
, Japanese sculptor
, Japanese politician
, Japanese voice actress
, Japanese politician
, Japanese musician and composer
, Japanese architect
, Japanese table tennis player
, Japanese footballer
, Japanese footballer
, Japanese film director
, Japanese motorcycle tuner and race team owner
, Japanese long-distance runner 
, Japanese archaeologist
, Japanese volleyball player
, Japanese voice actor
, Japanese singer

Japanese-language surnames